Borisovo is a rural locality (a selo) in Borisoglebskoye Rural Settlement, Muromsky District, Vladimir Oblast, Russia. The population was 475 as of 2010. There are 11 streets.

Geography 
Borisovo is located 14 km north of Murom (the district's administrative centre) by road. Chaadayevo is the nearest rural locality.

References 

Rural localities in Muromsky District
Muromsky Uyezd